Volodymyr Panteley (3 May 194517 April 2000) was a Ukrainian middle-distance runner. He competed in the men's 1500 metres at the 1972 Summer Olympics, representing the Soviet Union.

References

External links
 

1945 births
2000 deaths
Athletes (track and field) at the 1972 Summer Olympics
Soviet male middle-distance runners
Ukrainian male middle-distance runners
Olympic athletes of the Soviet Union
Place of birth missing